The 2006–07 Luge World Cup was a multi race series over a season for luge. The season started on 18 November 2006 and ended on 18 February 2007. The World Cup is organised by the FIL.

Calendar

Standings

Men's singles

Men's doubles

Women's singles

Team Relay

References

2006 in luge
2007 in luge
Luge World Cup